Catchall is a hamlet  in west Cornwall, England, UK.

There are a number of prehistoric standing stones nearby that have been scheduled as ancient monuments by English Heritage; the Blind Fiddler, the Long Stones and Tresvennack Pillar are all within  of Catchall. Excavations revealed that between the two stones is a rectangular pit. The Tresvennack Pillar is a single upright monolith with a large vertical crack and standing almost 4m high.

The freehold tenement of Catchall, then being part of Hendra was sold by public auction on 23 June 1883. At the time of selling it was occupied by Mr William Jacka, on a yearly tenancy and included  for cultivation, a farmhouse, barn, stable two pig-houses, cart shed, etc. The tenement was purchased by Thomas Bedford Bolitho, a local banker and industrialist, who owned nearby Kerris.

References

Hamlets in Cornwall
Penwith